Welton is a city in Clinton County, Iowa, United States. The population was 121 at the time of the 2020 census.

The community is located adjacent to U.S. Route 61, which bypasses Welton just to the east of the city. Prior to the expansion of Highway 61 to a four-lane highway, it passed directly through the city. Following reconstruction of U.S. 61, a new truck stop was built adjacent to U.S. 61 near the southern edge of the city.

History
Welton got its start in the year 1871, following construction of the Davenport and St. Paul Railroad through the territory.

Education
Welton is one of the communities in the Central DeWitt Community School District, which spans a large portion of central Clinton County; it was known as the Central Clinton Community School District until July 1, 2014.

For more than 40 years, the district operated Welton Elementary School to serve students in the north-central part of the district, with junior high and high school students being bused to DeWitt. According to the Quad City Times, "the 85-year-old school  closed in 2005 because of budget constraints and declining enrollment," and on April 5, 2006 the 85-year-old Welton School building was demolished. Until 1961, the school building also housed junior high and high school students as part of the Welton Independent School District; sports teams were known as the Wolverines. The junior-senior high school was closed in 1961, when Welton, along with the former Grand Mound and DeWitt school districts, consolidated to form the Central Community School District.

Welton Elementary had three buildings. The third floor of the main building had a computer laboratory, a library, and a media center. In addition to the main building, there was an art room and teacher's lounge facility, and a modular facility with two classrooms. Welton Elementary had 217 students in the 1998–1999 school year. Grand Mound Elementary students used the library, media and computer facilities at Welton Elementary. The district at one time considered expanding Welton Elementary to upper elementary levels but decided against it since it deemed the building too out of date and architecturally difficult to renovate, citing narrow staircases which would have difficulty accommodating chairlifts and the multi-story design. Welton was not fully accessible to handicapped students.

Circa 2001 there was a bond proposal to expand the elementary schools in DeWitt, which would have centralized services and facilities for the handicapped, and close the schools in Grand Mound and Welton. Welton Elementary closed in the summer of 2005, and was demolished in 2006. A historic newspaper was found inside the cornerstone, and the City of Welton government received the school memorabilia.

Geography
Welton is located at  (41.912283, -90.601152).

Demographics

2010 census
As of the census of 2010, there were 165 people, 61 households, and 49 families residing in the city. The racial makeup of the city was 96.4% White and 3.6% from two or more races. Hispanic or Latino of any race were 0.6% of the population.

There were 61 households, of which 41.0% had children under the age of 18 living with them, 57.4% were married couples living together, 13.1% had a female householder with no husband present, 9.8% had a male householder with no wife present, and 19.7% were non-families. 16.4% of all households were made up of individuals, and 6.6% had someone living alone who was 65 years of age or older. The average household size was 2.70 and the average family size was 2.94.

The median age in the city was 38.5 years. 27.9% of residents were under the age of 18; 4.9% were between the ages of 18 and 24; 29.7% were from 25 to 44; 25.4% were from 45 to 64; and 12.1% were 65 years of age or older. The gender makeup of the city was 47.3% male and 52.7% female.

2000 census
As of the census of 2000, there were 159 people, 57 households, and 47 families residing in the city. The racial makeup of the city was 97.48% White, 0.63% African American, and 1.89% from two or more races. Hispanic or Latino of any race were 0.63% of the population.

There were 57 households, out of which 38.6% had children under the age of 18 living with them, 64.9% were married couples living together, 10.5% had a female householder with no husband present, and 15.8% were non-families. 12.3% of all households were made up of individuals, and 1.8% had someone living alone who was 65 years of age or older. The average household size was 2.79 and the average family size was 3.02.

In the city, the population was spread out, with 27.0% under the age of 18, 8.8% from 18 to 24, 28.9% from 25 to 44, 27.0% from 45 to 64, and 8.2% who were 65 years of age or older. The median age was 32 years. For every 100 females, there were 89.3 males. For every 100 females age 18 and over, there were 96.6 males.

The median income for a household in the city was $48,750, and the median income for a family was $42,500. Males had a median income of $39,688 versus $22,083 for females. The per capita income for the city was $17,680. None of the population or families were below the poverty line.

References

Cities in Clinton County, Iowa
Cities in Iowa
1871 establishments in Iowa
Populated places established in 1871